Motocross Madness is a motocross racing video game developed by Rainbow Studios and published by Microsoft.

A sequel, Motocross Madness 2, was released in 2000. In 2013, a sequel for Xbox 360 was released, titled Motocross Madness. In the game, one can earn money by utilizing "career mode", but play for fun in Baja, Stunts, Enduro, Supercross, and National levels as well.

Gameplay

The game is known for its realism, including terrain, audio, and "bone-chilling" motorcycle wrecks. If the player is in Stunt mode and goes out of bounds after climbing a large cliff, an "invisible slingshot" will cause the player and the bike fly across the map while a funny sound plays until both objects hit the ground. The "invisible slingshot" effect was also used in the game ATV Offroad Fury, also created by Rainbow Studios.

Development
The game went gold on July 24, 1998.

Reception

The game received favorable reviews according to the review aggregation website GameRankings.

Sales
The game sold 35,922 units during 1998. These sales accounted for $1.54 million in revenue that year.

Awards
The game won Computer Games Strategy Plus 1998 "Racing Game of the Year" award. The staff hailed it as "perhaps the best motorcycle racing game of all time." PC Gamer US also named it the best racing game of 1998. The game was a finalist for the Academy of Interactive Arts & Sciences' 1998 "Sports Game of the Year" and "Outstanding Achievement in Software Engineering" awards, both of which went to FIFA 99 and Metal Gear Solid, respectively; and for GameSpots 1998 "Driving Game of the Year" award, which ultimately went to Need for Speed III: Hot Pursuit.

References

External links

1998 video games
Extreme sports video games
Microsoft games
Microsoft franchises
Motorcycle video games
Multiplayer and single-player video games
Off-road racing video games
Racing video games
Video games developed in the United States
Windows games
Windows-only games
Rainbow Studios games